Gina or GINA or variation may refer to:

Gina
Gina may refer to:

 Gina (given name), multiple individuals
 Gina (Canaan), a town in ancient Canaan
 Arihant (Jainism), also called gina, a term for a human who has conquered his or her inner passions
 Gina (film), a Canadian drama film
 "Gina" (song), a 1962 single by Johnny Mathis

GINA
GINA may refer to:

 Genetic Information Nondiscrimination Act, a bill signed into United States law in 2008 designed to restrict the use of genetic information in health insurance and employment
 BMW GINA, a prototype car by BMW
 Global Initiative for Asthma
 Global Information Network Architecture, developed in conjunction with the United States Department of Defense
 Graphical identification and authentication, dynamic-link library (DLL)
 G.I.N.A, album by Amerado, 2022

See also

 
 
 Gino (disambiguation)
 Regina (disambiguation)
 Jina (disambiguation)
 GNA (disambiguation)
 JNA (disambiguation)